Marius is a 1931 French drama film directed by Alexander Korda. It is based on the 1929 play of the same title by Marcel Pagnol. The film is a part of the Marseille Trilogy which includes the films Fanny (Marius's ex-fiancée) and César (Marius's father). The film was selected to be screened in the Cannes Classics section of the 2015 Cannes Film Festival. The restored film was also given a limited re-release in the United States by Janus Films on 4 January 2017, first premiering at Film Forum.

The film was made by Korda for the French subsidiary of Paramount Pictures. A separate Swedish-language version Longing for the Sea by John W. Brunius was also released in 1931 and a German-language version The Golden Anchor, also directed by Korda, was released the following year.

Synopsis
The film takes place mostly in the waterfront bar of César, Marius's father. Marius works in the bar and his good friend since childhood, Fanny, works outside the bar selling cockles. Marius has a hidden desire to travel to exotic places with the ship crews that depart from the docks of Marseille. This desire becomes exposed when a rich older man (Panisse) proposes to Fanny and Marius gets jealous. Marius' jealousy of Panisse is the first indication of the secret feelings that he has for her, but much to his surprise, the feelings are reciprocated by Fanny. She confesses that she loves Marius prompting him to reveal his plans of traveling the world to her, noting that being the wife of a man at sea is not a desirable life. After a few nights, it is discovered that they have slept together and Marius's father and Fanny's mother convince him to marry her. Marius becomes noticeably melancholy after proposing to Fanny until a few days later, the date of departure of a boat on which Marius was supposed to crew. Fanny, realizing that Marius is not truly happy being with her, decides to encourage him to leave. She helps distract his father while Marius sneaks onto the boat.

Cast (in credits order)
 Raimu as César Olivier
 Pierre Fresnay as Marius
 Orane Demazis as Fanny
 Fernand Charpin as Honoré Panisse
 Alida Rouffe as Honorine Cabanis
 Paul Dullac as Félix Escartefigue
 Alexandre Mihalesco as Piquoiseau
 Robert Vattier as Albert Brun
 Édouard Delmont as Le Goelec
 Milly Mathis as Tante Claudine Foulon
 Marcel Maupi as Innocent Mangiapan Le Chauffeur Du Ferry-Boat
 Lucien Callamand as Le Quartier-Maitre Du Ferry-Boat
 Queret as Felicite
 Valentine Ribe as Un Client / A Customer
 Vassy as Un Arabe

In popular culture
Port of Seven Seas is James Whale's remake of Marius and Fanny.
The famed restaurateur and founder of California cuisine, Alice Waters, was so taken by this film that she named her Berkeley restaurant "Chez Panisse". The café upstairs from the restaurant is decorated with posters from the films Marius, Fanny, and César.
The main characters from the films Marius, Fanny and César make a cameo appearance in the Asterix comic book Asterix and the Banquet. The card playing scene in the comic book is a reference to a similar scene in this film.

References

External links
 
 
 
 
 
 Vidéo of the movie
 The Marseille Trilogy: Life Goes to the Movies an essay by Michael Atkinson at the Criterion Collection

1930s romantic comedy-drama films
1931 films
Films based on works by Marcel Pagnol
Films directed by Alexander Korda
Films set in Marseille
1930s French-language films
French films based on plays
Films shot at Joinville Studios
Seafaring films
French romantic comedy-drama films
1931 comedy films
1931 drama films
French black-and-white films
1930s French films